Yalova is a market-gardening town located in northwestern Turkey on the eastern coast of the Sea of Marmara. The town has a  population of 156,838, while the population of the surrounding Yalova Province is 291,001 . A largely modern town, it is best known for the spa resort at nearby Termal, a popular summer retreat for residents of Istanbul.

Regular ferries connect Yalova with Istanbul via the Sea of Marmara. They are operated by İDO.

Name 
The name Yalova is assumed to be a contraction of Yalıova. Yalı means 'house at the coast' and ova means 'plain' in Turkish

History

Ancient Yalova

The first settlement in the region dates back to the Prehistoric Period, in around 3000 BC. The Hittites ruled the region in the 21st century BC, followed by the Phrygians in the 13th century BC, and then the Greeks in the archaic, classical and Hellenistic eras. The region was conquered by the Romans in 74 BC. After the fall of the Roman Empire, it became part of the Byzantine Empire.

In Antiquity and for most of the Middle Ages, the town was known as Pylae or Pylai, which is Greek for "gates" since it was positioned at the start of one of the main routes to Asia for anyone crossing the Sea of Marmara into Bithynia from Europe.

Middle Ages
In the Byzantine period the town retained some its importance due to its geographic location, and emperors frequently used it as a disembarkation point from Constantinople. Thus Emperor Heraclius landed here in 622, at the beginning of his counter-offensive against the Persians, and Romanos IV Diogenes did the same in 1071, on his way to the Battle of Manzikert. In the 9th century, the town was also the site of one of the beacons that transmitted news from the frontier with the Abbasid Caliphate, and contained an imperial hostel for travellers. In the late 10th century, however, Leo of Synada described Pylae as little more than a village, where cattle, horses, pigs and other animals were gathered to be shipped to Constantinople.

After their victory at Manzikert, the town and surrounding district were raided by the Seljuk Turks but soon recovered. In 1147 Greek refugees from Phrygia were settled here. In a 1199 charter of privileges granted to Venetian merchants, it is listed as a separate fiscal district (episkepsi) along with neighbouring Pythia Therma, and it was a separate province by the time of the Fourth Crusade (1204). Following the fall of Constantinople to the Crusaders, Pylae formed part of the Empire of Nicaea, and served as the main port for Nicaea itself. Pylae remained in Byzantine hands until ca. 1302, when Turkish attacks intensitied, forcing much of the population to abandon it and seek refuge in the Princes' Islands.

Ottoman and Republican eras
Shortly afterwards, Yalova was incorporated into the territory of the Ottoman Empire under the leadership of Orhan. It became part of the Sanjak of Kocaeli and was known successively as "Yalakabad" and "Yalıova". Since the second half of the 19th century, a large number of Avar immigrants from Dagestan moved into the town.

According to the Ottoman population statistics of 1914, the kaza of Yalova had a total population of 21,532, consisting of 10,274 Greeks, 7,954 Turks and 3,304 Armenians. On 5 September 1920 It was occupied by the Greek Army during the Turkish War of Independence. At this time, the Yalova Peninsula massacres occurred which were committed by the Greek Army against the local Turkish population. Yalova was captured by Turkish troops on 19 July 1921. 

Mustafa Kemal Atatürk occasionally lived in Yalova in his later years, claiming in one of his speeches that "Yalova is my city." After the recapture of Yalova by the Turkish Army on 19 July 1921, the Greek and Armenian populations were either massacred or expelled as part of the wider Greek and Armenian genocides.

Yalova was initially the centre for the Karamürsel district of Kocaeli Province. In 1930 it became a district centre in Istanbul province after joining two villages from Orhangazi. Finally in 1995 it became a provincial capital.

Attractions

In Yalova town 
In the town itself the only significant attraction is the so-called Yürüyen Köşkü (Walking Pavilon), a pretty waterside villa which was used by Mustafa Kemal Atatürk, the founder of the modern Turkey, during his visits. It takes its name from the fact that Atatürk preferred to have it dismantled and moved slightly rather than cut down a tree that was impeding the view as its grew.

The Yalova Earthquake Monument in the 17 August Park on the coast of Marmara Sea commemorates the thousands of lives lost in August 1999 when a huge earthquake devastated the north-west corner of Turkey which included Yalova.

In Termal 
Yalova is best known for the hot springs in the Termal district, which gets its name from the Greek word thermae 'warm'. There appears to have been some sort of spa resort here since Byzantine times and the 17th-century travel writer Evliya Çelebi reported the existence of the Kurşunlu Banyo (Leaded Bath) at the time of his visit. The resort was expanded during the reign of Sultan Abdülhamid II and again during Atatürk's day.

Also in Termal is the Atatürk Arboretum which is said to contain 1800 different species of plant. It was commissioned by Atatürk in 1929 and was the first arboretum in the country.  A summer-house used by Atatürk is also open to the public in the grounds.

Sport 
Yalovaspor BK is a basketball club that represents Yalova in the Turkish Super League.

The local football team is Yalovaspor, which plays in the Turkish Regional Amateur League.

Climate 
Yalova has a Mediterranean climate (Köppen: Csa, Trewartha: Cs), with cool, wet winters and hot, relatively dry summers.

International relations

Twin towns — sister cities
Yalova is twinned with:

 Batumi, Georgia
 Bilhorod-Dnistrovskyi, Ukraine
 Budva, Montenegro
 Khasavyurt, Russia
 Komotini, Greece
 Kyrenia, Cyprus
 Lefkoniko, Cyprus
 Makhachkala, Russia
 Medgidia, Romania
 Novi Pazar, Serbia
 Ohrid, North Macedonia
 Panjin, China
 Peć, Kosovo
 Rottenburg am Neckar, Germany
 Smolyan, Bulgaria
 Suwon, South Korea
 Tonami, Japan
 Travnik, Bosnia and Herzegovina
 Trogir, Croatia

Notable natives 
 Sarkis Minassian - Armenian journalist, killed in the Armenian genocide
 Muharrem İnce - Politician
 İzel (İzel Çeliköz) - Singer
 Mehmet Okur - NBA basketball player
 Şebnem Ferah - Singer
 Vefa Salman  - Politician

References and notes

External links

 Yalova photographs
 Yalova / INFO
 Visit Yalova
 Yalova Fotograf Amatörleri Dernegi YAFOD Yalova photographs
 Yalova Hotels Guide

 
Port cities of the Sea of Marmara
Seaside resorts in Turkey
Fishing communities in Turkey
 
Districts of Yalova Province